Abd-al-Dar ibn Qusai forms an important link between his father, Qusai ibn Kilab (c. 400–480), the great-great-grandfather of Shaiba ibn Hashim (Abdul-Mutallib) and his own sons Uthman and Abd Manaf, since he is the progenitor of the Banu Abd-al-dar.

See also
 Adnanite Arabs
 List of notable Hijazis

References

Sahabah ancestors
5th-century Arabs